is a Japanese web manga series written and illustrated by Fuyu Azuma. It has been serialized on Niconico Seiga's Dra Dra Sharp# website since June 2018.

Characters

Publication
Written and illustrated by Fuyu Azuma, Kao ni Denai Kashiwada-san to Kao ni Deru О̄ta-kun started on Niconico Seiga's Dragon Dragon Age on June 22, 2018; the site was renamed Dra Dra Sharp# in December of the same year. Kadokawa Shoten has collected its chapters into individual tankōbon volumes. The first volume was released on December 7, 2018. A promotional video animated by Seven Arcs was released on October 3, 2022; Yui Kinoshita directed, supervised, designed the characters, and wrote the storyboard for the PV. Risa Yoshida was an animation director. As of December 9, 2022, nine volumes have been released.

Volume list

References

External links
  

Fujimi Shobo manga
Japanese webcomics
Romantic comedy anime and manga
Shōnen manga
Webcomics in print